Jonathan Metcalf represented Dedham, Massachusetts in the Great and General Court. He was also town clerk and selectman in 1755.

References

Works cited

Members of the colonial Massachusetts General Court from Dedham
Year of birth missing
Year of death missing
Dedham, Massachusetts selectmen
Dedham Town Clerks
Members of the Massachusetts General Court